Military Ocean Terminals are operated by the U.S. Army Surface Deployment and Distribution Command (SDDC) for distribution of surface cargo from storage and repair depots to military forward based units.

Current facilities
 Military Ocean Terminal Concord (MOTCO), California on the Stockton Deepwater Shipping Channel (formerly Concord Naval Weapons Station)
 Military Ocean Terminal Sunny Point (MOTSU), North Carolina

Former and closed facilities
 Military Ocean Terminal (MOTBY), Bayonne, New Jersey, closed 1999  
 New Orleans Military Ocean Terminal (NOMOT), New Orleans, Louisiana, Closed December 1994 
 Military Ocean Terminal Bay Area (MOTBA), headquartered at Oakland Army Base, Oakland, California, closed 1999.

References

External links
Surface Deployment and Distribution Command (SDDC) web site

United States Army logistics installations